Five is the fifth studio album by guitarist Greg Howe, released on October 22, 1996 through Shrapnel Records.

Critical reception

Andy Hinds at AllMusic gave Five two stars out of five, describing it as sounding much like its three predecessors (Introspection, Uncertain Terms and Parallax). He praised Howe for his "incomprehensibly fast soloing and impeccable note choice" and bassist Kevin Vecchione for his "great enthusiasm brought to the table", but remarked that the album may be "Predictable or dependable, depending on your point of view."

Track listing

Personnel
Greg Howe – guitar, keyboard, drums, engineering, mixing, production
Kevin Vecchione – bass
Mike Iacopelli – mastering

References

External links
In Review: Greg Howe "Five" at Guitar Nine Records

Greg Howe albums
1996 albums
Shrapnel Records albums
Albums recorded in a home studio